Stanley J. "Tiny" Sandford (February 26, 1894October 29, 1961) was an American actor who is best remembered for his roles in Laurel and Hardy and Charlie Chaplin films. His tall, burly physique usually led him to be cast as a comic heavy, and often played policemen, doormen, prizefighters, or bullies.

Biography
Sandford was born in Osage, Iowa, in 1894. After working in stock theater he began acting in movies around 1910. He appeared in The Gold Rush with Charlie Chaplin. Other Chaplin films that he appeared in include The Circus (1928) and Modern Times (1936), where he plays "Big Bill". His films with Laurel and Hardy include Big Business (1929),  Double Whoopee (1929), The Chimp (1932), and Our Relations (1936). He appeared in The Warrior's Husband as a clumsy and cowardly Hercules. Sandford also acted in Way Out West, but his sequence was cut from the final take.

He also appeared in dramas such as The World's Champion (1922) and The Iron Mask (1929).

He retired from acting in 1940, the year he had a very small role in Charlie Chaplin's The Great Dictator. He died in Los Angeles, California on October 29, 1961.

Filmography

Notes

References
Maltin, Leonard (1973). The Laurel & Hardy Book. New York: Curtis.

External links

 

1894 births
1961 deaths
American male film actors
American male silent film actors
Hal Roach Studios actors
Male actors from Iowa
People from Osage, Iowa
20th-century American male actors
Silent film comedians